Mueang Surin is the capital district (amphoe mueang) of Surin province, northeastern Thailand.

Geography
Neighboring districts are (from the north clockwise): Chom Phra, Khwao Sinarin, Sikhoraphum, Lamduan and Prasat of Surin Province; Krasang and Satuek of Buriram province.

Administration
The district is divided into 21 sub-districts (tambons), which are further subdivided into 292 villages (mubans). The town (thesaban mueang) Surin covers the whole tambon Nai Mueang. Mueang Thi is a sub-district municipality (thesaban tambon) which covers parts of tambon Mueang Thi. There are a further 20 tambon administrative organizations (TAO).

Missing numbers now form Khwao Sinarin District.

References

External links
amphoe.com (Thai)

Mueang Surin